XGI is XGI Technology Inc., a computer graphics company.

XGI or xgi may also refer to:

 Ruger XGI, a rifle
 Biri language (ISO 639: xgi)